Guillermo Federico Kammerichs (born June 21, 1980) is a former Argentine professional basketball player, who last played with Unión de Goya. At 6 ft 8 in (2.05 m) tall and 245 lbs. (111 kg) in weight, he could play at the small forward and power forward positions. He also holds German citizenship, because he is of German descent.

Professional career
Some of the clubs Kammerichs played with professionally included: Ferro Carril Oeste of the Argentine League (1998–01), Ourense of the Spanish Second Division (2001–02), Valencia (2002–05), Girona (2005–06), Bruesa GBC (2006–07), Murcia (2007–08) of the Spanish First Division, and Flamengo of the Brazilian League (2011–12). He went back to Argentina after a year, at the end of his season with Flamengo, to play again with Regatas.

Kammerichs was selected by the Portland Trail Blazers in the 2nd round (51st pick overall) of the 2002 NBA Draft but ended up never playing in a single NBA game (making him 1 of 9 players selected in that draft that never played in the league).

National team career
Kammerichs defended Argentina at FIBA Americas Championships: a gold medal 2011, silver medals at the 2003, 2005, and 2007), and bronze medal in 2009. They brought home a bronze medal at both the 2008 Summer Olympic Games.

Awards and accomplishments

Pro career
EuroCup Champion: (2003)
Super 8 Tournament Winner: (2008)
Super 8 Tournament MVP: (2008)
FIBA Americas League Grand Finals MVP: (2011)

Argentina national team
2003 South American Championship: 
2003 FIBA Americas Championship: 
2005 FIBA Americas Championship: 
2007 FIBA Americas Championship: 
2008 FIBA Diamond Ball Tournament: 
2008 Summer Olympic Games: 
2009 FIBA Americas Championship: 
2011 FIBA Americas Championship:

References

External links
NBA.com Profile
Euroleague.net Profile
FIBA Profile
Latinbasket.com Profile
Spanish League Profile 

1980 births
Living people
2010 FIBA World Championship players
Argentine expatriate basketball people in Brazil
Argentine expatriate basketball people in Spain
Argentine men's basketball players
Argentine people of German descent
Basketball players at the 2008 Summer Olympics
Basketball players at the 2012 Summer Olympics
CB Girona players
CB Murcia players
Club Ourense Baloncesto players
Ferro Carril Oeste basketball players
Flamengo basketball players
German men's basketball players
Gipuzkoa Basket players
Liga ACB players
Medalists at the 2008 Summer Olympics
Novo Basquete Brasil players
Olympic basketball players of Argentina
Olympic bronze medalists for Argentina
Olympic medalists in basketball
People from Goya
Portland Trail Blazers draft picks
Power forwards (basketball)
Regatas Corrientes basketball players
Small forwards
Valencia Basket players
Sportspeople from Corrientes Province